Margaret Thomson Davis (24 May 1926 – 14 June 2016) was a Scottish writer of novels about Glasgow life, beginning with her popular 1972 novel, The Breadmakers.

Biography
Thomson Davis was born in Bathgate, West Lothian, and was three years old when her family moved to Balornock, a district in the city of Glasgow. Brought up in the tenements of Springburn, she had an early ambition to be a writer, and after leaving school she worked at various short-term jobs while submitting her stories to magazines. In 1951 she had a short-lived marriage, and in 1958 she married a second time and had a son, who was aged nine when the family moved to Bearsden. She would be in her late forties before she had her first book published.

In 1972, her first novel, The Breadmakers, was published by Allison and Busby, and was described by the Daily Express as a Glaswegian Coronation Street. It was followed by in 1973 A Baby Might Be Crying and A Sort of Peace, forming a trilogy known to as The Breadmakers Saga.

She went on to be the author of more than 20 novels, and The Breadmakers Saga and Rag Woman, Rich Woman (1987) were adapted for the stage. As well as her bestselling family sagas and crime thrillers, she also wrote an autobiography, Write from the Heart (2006).

Thomson Davis was Honorary President of the Strathkelvin Writers' Group.

Selected works

Novels

 The Breadmakers (1972)
 A Baby Might Be Crying (1973)
 A Sort of Peace (1973)
 The Prisoner (1974)
 The Prince and the Tobacco Lords (1976)
 Roots of Bondage (1977)
 Scorpion in the Fire (1977)
 The Dark Side of Pleasure (1981)
 A Very Civilised Man (1982)
 Light and Dark (1984)
 Rag Woman, Rich Woman (1987)
 Daughters and Mothers (1988)
 Wounds of War (1989)
 A Woman of Property (1991)
 A Sense of Belonging (1993)
 Hold Me Forever (1994)
 Kiss Me No More (1995)
 A Kind of Immortality (1996)
 Burning Ambition (1997)
 Gallachers (1998)
 The Glasgow Belle (1999)
 A Tangled Web (1999)
 The Clydesiders (1999)
 The Gourlay Girls (2000)
 Clydesiders at War (2001)
 In a Strange Land (2001)
 A Darkening of the Heart (2003)
 The New Breadmakers (2003)
 A Deadly Deception (2005)
 Goodmans of Glassford Street (2007)
 Red Alert (2008)
 Double Danger (2009)
 The Kellys of Kelvingrove (2010)

References

External links
"My Memorable Day | Margaret Thompson Davis", BBC Radio Scotland, Days like this.

1926 births
2016 deaths
People from Bathgate
20th-century Scottish novelists
21st-century Scottish novelists
20th-century Scottish women writers
21st-century Scottish women writers